Weber—The Contemporary West (formerly Weber Studies) is a leading American literary magazine, founded in 1984 and based at Weber State University in Ogden, Utah.  It focuses on the literature and culture of the American West.  Work that has been published in Weber Studies has received commendation by the O. Henry Prize.

The journal awards the O. Marvin Lewis Essay Award, Sherwin W. Howard Poetry Award and Neila C. Seshachari Fiction Award.  The journal has featured interviews with notable writer including Barry Lopez, Carlos Fuentes, E. L. Doctorow and Robert Pinsky.

Notable contributors

Jenny Shank
Guenther Roth
Gary Gildner
Gary LaFontaine
Robert Dana
David James Duncan

Ann Beattie
Ken Burns
Ron Carlson
Jacob Appel
Terry Tempest Williams
Ryan Shoemaker

Masthead
Editor—Michael Wutz
Associate Editors—Russell Burrows, Victoria Ramirez, Kathryn L. MacKay, Brad Roghaar
Managing Editors—Elizabeth Dohrer

See also
List of literary magazines

References

External links
Weber Studies

1984 establishments in Utah
Biannual magazines published in the United States
Poetry magazines published in the United States
Magazines established in 1984
Magazines published in Utah
Weber State University